A train horn is an air horn used as an audible warning device on diesel and electric powered trains. Its primary purpose is to alert persons and animals to an oncoming train, especially when approaching a level crossing. They are often extremely loud, allowing them to be heard from great distances. They are also used for acknowledging signals given by railroad employees, such as during switching operations. For steam locomotives, the equivalent device is a train whistle.

History and background 
Since trains move on fixed rails, they are uniquely susceptible to collision. This is exacerbated by the train's enormous weight and inertia, which make it difficult to quickly stop when encountering an obstacle.  Also, trains generally do not stop at level crossings, instead relying on pedestrians and vehicles to clear the tracks when they pass.  Therefore, from their beginnings, locomotives have been equipped with loud horns or bells to warn vehicles and pedestrians that they are coming. Steam locomotives had steam whistles, operated from steam produced by their boilers.

As diesel locomotives began to replace steam on most railroads during the mid-20th century, it was realized that the new locomotives were unable to utilize the steam whistles then in use.  Early internal combustion locomotives were initially fitted with small truck horns or exhaust-powered whistles, but these were found to be unsuitable and hence the air horn design was scaled up and modified for railroad use. Early train horns often were tonally similar to the air horns still heard on road-going trucks today. It was found that this caused some confusion among people who were accustomed to steam locomotives and the sound of their whistles; when approaching a grade crossing, when some people heard an air horn they expected to see a truck, not a locomotive, and accidents happened. So, locomotive air horns were created that had a much higher, more musical note, tonally much more like a steam whistle. This is why most train horns have a unique sound, different from that of road going trucks, although many switch engines, which didn't see road service (service on the main lines), retained the deeper truck-like horns.

Strict regulations specific to each country specify how loud horns must be, and how far in advance of grade crossings and other locations locomotive engineers are required to sound their horns to give adequate time to clear the tracks.  Standard signals consisting of different sequences of horn blasts must be given in different circumstances.

Due to the encroachment of development, some suburban dwellers have opposed railroad use of the air horn as a trackside warning device. 
Residents in some communities have attempted to establish quiet zones, in which train crews are instructed not to sound their horns, except in case of emergency.

Recent years have seen an increase of horn theft from railroad property.

Operation 

Train horns are operated by compressed air, typically 125-140 psi (8.6-9.6 bar), and fed from a locomotive main air reservoir.  When the engineer opens the horn valve, air flows through a supply line into the power chamber at the horn's base (diagram, right). It passes through a narrow opening between a nozzle and a circular diaphragm in the power chamber, then out through the flaring horn bell. The flow of air past the diaphragm causes it to vibrate or oscillate against the nozzle, producing sound.

When an air horn is not operating and has no fluid pressure flowing through it, the interior of the power chamber housing is completely airtight, as the diaphragm disc creates a full airtight seal against the nozzle surface. As this diagram illustrates, when a constant stream of pressurized fluid enters through the small bottom inlet, the pressure in the airtight power chamber increases. The pressure continues rising in Chamber 'A' until the pressure overcomes the diaphragm's spring tension. Once this occurs, the diaphragm is deflected back and is no longer sealed against the nozzle, causing the power chamber to lose its airtightness. The pressurized fluid then escapes out of the horn bell, at a much faster rate than it enters the power chamber, causing the pressure in the power chamber to drop rapidly and the diaphragm to re-seat itself against the nozzle surface. This entire process is one cycle of the diaphragm operating. In reality, it occurs much faster, in accordance to the frequency produced by the horn. The diaphragm's constant back-and-forth oscillation creates sound waves, which are amplified by the large flared horn bell. The horn bell's length, thickness and diameter contribute to the frequency of the note the horn produces.

When vibrated by the diaphragm, the column of air in the bell oscillates with standing waves. The bell's length determines the waves' wavelength, and thus the fundamental frequency (pitch) of the note produced by the horn (measured in hertz).  The longer the bell, the lower the note.

North American diesel locomotives manufactured prior to the 1990s used an air valve actuated by the engineer through the manipulation of a lever or pull cord. This made possible a practice known as "feathering", where the engineer could affect the horn's modulation, and thus its volume, by changing the volume of air flowing into it.

Many locomotives manufactured during the 1990s have push-button horn controls. Several North American locomotives incorporated a sequencer pedal, built into the cab floor beneath the operator's position; when depressed, they sound the crossing sequence.

Locomotives of European origin have had push-button horn controls since the mid-1960s.

Current production locomotives from GE Transportation Systems and Electro-Motive Diesel use a lever-actuated solenoid valve.

United States 

On April 27, 2005, the Federal Railroad Administration (FRA), which enforces rail safety regulations, published the final rule on the use of locomotive horns at highway-rail grade crossings.  Effective June 24, 2005, the rule requires that locomotive horns be sounded at all public grade crossings at least 15 seconds, but not more than 20 seconds before entering a crossing. This rule applies when the train speed is below 45 mph (70 km/h). At 45 mph or above, trains are still required to sound their horn at the designated location (usually denoted with a whistle post).

The pattern for blowing the horn remains two long, one short, and one long. This is to be repeated or prolonged as necessary until the lead locomotive fully occupies the crossing. Locomotive engineers retain the authority to vary this pattern as necessary for crossings in close proximity, and are allowed to sound the horn in emergency situations no matter where the location.

A ban on sounding locomotive horns in Florida was ordered removed by the FRA after it was shown that the accident rate doubled during the ban. The new ruling preempts any state or local laws regarding the use of the train horn at public crossings. This also provides public authorities the option to maintain or establish quiet zones provided certain supplemental or alternative safety measures are in place, and the crossing accident rate meets government standards.

Common horn signals 
The following are the required horn signals listed in the operating rules of most North American railroads, along with their meanings. Signals are illustrated by an "." for short sounds, and "–" for longer sounds. (Note that these signals and their indications are updated to reflect modern practice; in earlier times there were unique whistle signals for the engineer to, for example, send out and then later recall the brakeman/flagman riding in the caboose.) Those rules marked with an asterisk (*) must be sounded when or where applicable. Those signals without an asterisk convey information to employees; they must be used when voice communication is not available.

Exception: Engine horn signals required by rules 14 (b) and 14 (h) do not apply after momentary stops in continuous switching movements.

Canada 
According to section 11 of Transport Canada's Locomotive Design Requirements, all Canadian-owned passenger train locomotives must be equipped with a dual-tone horn capable of producing a soft sound in normal operating mode and a loud sound in emergency situations. To comply with federal requirements, passenger railways use the Nathan K5CA-LS. This horn has two different air chambers, allowing the engineer to choose between sounding three chimes in "soft" mode or all five chimes in "loud" mode. The "loud" mode is intended for emergency situations, such as when a person or vehicle is on the tracks in front of an incoming train. The loud emergency mode produces a high-pitched and extremely discordant sound to get people's attention.

To maximize sound output, Transport Canada requires that all train horns be mounted facing the direction of travel, near the front of the roof, no further than 1.5 meters behind the rear of the cab, and near the centerline of the locomotive in a location where it will not obstruct exhaust pipes in any direction.

Train horns must produce a minimum sound level of 96 decibels (dB) in a 30-meter radius from the locomotive.

Horn warning signals 
According to the May 2018 version of the Canadian Rail Operating Rules (CROR), specific train horn warning signals must be sounded as per rule 14. Like the American railroad authority, signals are illustrated using "o" for short sounds, and "___" for longer sounds. In the CROR, it states that warning signals "should be distinct, with intensity and duration proportionate to the distance the signal is to be conveyed". The following table lists the train horn warning signals required by Transport Canada. The signals marked with an asterisk (*) must not be replaced with radio communication.

Noise from train horns 
Residents living in close proximity to train tracks may be disturbed by the sounding of train horn warning signals. However, train drivers are obligated to sound their horns at all times, which may lead to noise complaints. Transport Canada allows municipalities to pass bylaws that prohibit train horn sounding at train stations and level crossings, as long as Transport Canada grants approval to that municipality.

Germany 
Horn signals are regulated in the Zp category of the Eisenbahn-Bau- und Betriebsordnung. Their most common use today is when approaching a level crossing that lacks barriers, and for warning purposes.

Whistle posts are labeled with the letter "P" (for 'Pfeifen').
Common signals are:

France 

Train horns are sounded where a whistle post (marked with the letter "S" for "siffler") is present. If the whistle post is labelled "J" (meaning "jour"), the horn is only to be sounded between 0700 and 2000. Horns must also be sounded when passing an oncoming train, and shortly before reaching the last car of the train.
Train horns must also be used upon entering into a tunnel: first horn shortly before the tunnel entrance, second horn when entering, third horn shortly before the tunnel's exit.

India 
The IRFCA FAQ lists the following:

'o' : denotes a short blast on the horn. 
'--' : denotes a comparatively long blast on the horn. 
'-----' : denotes a longer blast on the horn. 
'----------' : denotes a very long blast on the horn.

Code [ o ] - Before Starting:
 Indication to driver of the assisting engine that driver of leading engine is ready to start.
 Acknowledgement by the driver of the assisting engine.
 Engine ready to leave yard
 Engine ready to go to loco yard
 Light loco or shunter about to move
Code [ o ] - On the run:
 Assistance of other engine not required
 Acknowledgement by driver of the assisting engine
Code [ -- ]
 Normal departure from station on receipt of clear signal. This is usually followed by another long blast about 10–20 seconds after the first one, after the guard's all-right signal is received.
 Beginning of shunting operation (if shunted rake has passengers in it)
Code [ o o ]
 Call for guard's signal
 Signals not exchanged by guard
 Signals not exchanged by station staff
Code [ -- o ]
 Guard to release brakes
 Before starting engine from a midsection/station
 Main Line clear
Code [ o o o ]
 Guard to apply brakes
 Train out of control, guard to assist
Code [ o o -- ]
 Sudden loss of brake pressure or vacuum (perhaps by alarm chain being pulled)
Code [ o o o o ]
 Train cannot proceed on account of accident, failure or other cause
 Protect train in rear
Code [ -- -- o o ]
 Call for guard to come to engine
Code [ o -- o ]
 Token not received
 Token missed
 With wrong authority to proceed
 Passing stop signal at 'on' on proper authority
Code [ ----- ] - Before Starting
 Vacuum recreated on ghat section, remove sprags
 Passing automatic 'stop' signal at 'On'
Code [ ----- ] - On the run
 Acknowledgement of guards signal
Code [ ---------- ]
 Approaching level crossing or tunnel area
 Recall staff protecting train in rear
 Material train ready to leave
 Running through a station
 Approaching a stop signal at 'on'
 Detained at stop signal
 Crossing stop signal at 'on' after waiting the stipulated time.
Code [ -- o -- o ]
 Alarm chain pulled
 Insufficient vacuum in engine
 Guard applies vacuum brakes.
Code [ -- -- ]
 Raise Pantograph (electric loco only)
Code [ -- o -- ]
 Lower Pantograph (electric loco only)
Code [ o o o o o o o o o ] (Frequently)
 Apprehension of danger
 Danger signal to driver of an approaching train whose path is obstructed
 Moving in wrong direction on a double line.
 Also used by EMU motormen to warn passengers on a crowded platform of the approach of a fast train which will not stop at that station

United Kingdom

UK diesel and electric locomotives are usually fitted with two-tone horns, sounded sequentially to distinguish them from the horns used on road vehicles, the tones being described as either 'high' or 'low'. In the past, both tones were routinely used. However, because of noise complaints, new rules were introduced in 2007:

 The introduction of a night time quiet period, between 23:00 and 07:00 when trains will no longer routinely sound their horns at whistle boards (they will always sound their horns when people are seen on the track). The night time quiet period was changed by Network Rail in 2016 to 00:00 to 06:00.
 That where the technology is available, drivers should only use the low tone from the two tone horn at whistle boards.
 For all new or replacement train horns on trains capable of travelling up to 100 mph (160 km/h) a much lower minimum sound pressure level has been established – and a maximum sound level has been introduced (min 101 dB and max 106 dB).

British train Horns have two tones, high or low, and in some cases, a loud or soft setting. If the horn lacks a loud-or-soft soft setting then train drivers are to use the setting provided.

Placement on trains 
As many individuals do with their personal vehicles, railroads order locomotives and cab cars with different options in order to suit their operating practices. Air horns are no exception, and railroad mechanical forces mount these on locomotives where they are deemed most effective at projecting sound, and for ease of maintenance.

Audio samples 

The following are samples of select air horns as used in North American railroad service:

Manufacturers

North America

AirChime, Ltd. 
AirChime, Ltd. traces their beginnings through the work of Robert Swanson in 1949. Prior to the early 1950s, locomotives were equipped with air horns that sounded a singular note.

Swanson sought to develop an air horn which would mimic the sound of a classic steam whistle. Using ancient Chinese musical theory, Swanson produced the six-note model 'H6'. This was impractical for railroad use, due to its relatively large size. Railroad equipment operates over routes restricted by loading gauge, a difference of only a few inches may prohibit that equipment from operating on the line in question.

Swanson would later refine his 'H6' into the model 'H5'. As the numeric designation indicates, the horn sounds a five-note chord.

In 1950, AirChime introduced the 'M' series, a further improvement on the earlier horns through elimination of unnecessary moving parts. Among the earliest customers of the AirChime 'M' was the Southern Railway, which sought replacement horns for their motive power. The company announced this program through the placement of a full-page advertisement in the May 25, 1951 edition of the Washington Times-Herald.

Under Swanson's guidance, AirChime would focus on ease of mass production, low maintenance, and reliability in their air horn design, with the development of the 'P' (1953), and 'K' (1954) series

AirChime has been sold to their American licensee, Nathan Manufacturing, Inc., a division of Micro Precision Group, Inc, in Windham, Connecticut.

Buell Air Horns 

Founded in 1912 as The American Strombos Co. of Philadelphia, PA, Buell sold modified marine horns for rail use. They were often installed on small locomotives, electric interurban equipment. and railcars (for example the Doodlebugs).

Buell has recently made available a line of air horns specific for railroad equipment.

Gustin Bacon Mfg. Co. 
The Gustin Bacon Mfg. Co. of Kansas City, MO offered airhorns for use on railroad equipment prior to the Second World War.

Leslie Controls, Inc.
Leslie Controls, Inc. (originally the Leslie Company of Lyndhurst, New Jersey, later Parsippany, finally relocating to Tampa, Florida in 1985) began horn production by obtaining the rights to manufacture the Kockums Mekaniska Verkstad product line of "Tyfon" brand airhorns, marketing these for railroad use beginning in the 1930s. Their model A200 series would later grace the rooftops of countless locomotives, such as the legendary Pennsylvania Railroad GG1, as well as thousands of EMD E and F-units. Leslie eventually introduced their own line of multi-note airhorns, known as the "Chime-Tone" series, in direct competition with AirChime.

Poor sales of the Chime-Tones (due to the horns requiring an ample volume of air) led the Leslie Company to introduce a new line of air horns utilizing interchangeable components while using less air to produce greater sound volume than the earlier "Tyfon" series. Developed by Kockums, this horn utilized a back-pressure power chamber design in order to enhance diaphragm oscillation. Known as the "SuperTyfon" series, these horns would eventually supplant the "Tyfon" in railroad service.

"SuperTyfon" horns were offered in single, dual, triple, quad, and five note configurations.

Leslie Controls continues to manufacture "SuperTyfon" air horns for the railroad industry.

Prime Manufacturing, Inc. 

Prime Manufacturing, Inc. had produced locomotive appliances for many years prior to their entry into the air horn market in 1972. Their line of "Pneumatic Horns" was basically a derivative of the Leslie SuperTyfon design (having taken advantage of a patent expiration at the time), though their horns employed heavier castings than equivalents from Leslie, and sounding a somewhat richer timbre as a result.

Sales were brisk (railroads such as Union Pacific and the Burlington Northern were notable customers) but ultimately disappointing. Finding themselves increasingly unable to compete in a niche market dominated by Leslie Controls and AirChime, Prime ceased air horn production .

Westinghouse Air Brake Co. 

Westinghouse Air Brake Company (known throughout the 19th and 20th Century as WABCO) was the first to offer air horns specifically for use with railroad equipment, as early as the 1910s. Their model E2 was recognized by many for the deep, commanding tone it produced.

In response to the Leslie multi-note "Chime-Tone" series, Westinghouse offered a bracket to which three of their single-note "honkers" could be bolted onto, achieving the same result as what the Chime-Tones did for Leslie.

Overshadowed later on by Leslie and AirChime, WABCO eventually ceased production of most horns for the North American market.

At present, the company is known as Wabtec, Inc., and continues to offer their line of 'Pneumatic horns' for the export market.

Australia 
Railways in Australia often utilize the same type of air horns as their North American counterparts.

See also 
 Hancock air whistle
 Whistle post
 Air horn
 Foghorn

References

External links 

 Five Chime Consultants – online spotters' guide to diesel locomotive horns in North America 
 LocomotiveHorns.info – guide to collecting diesel locomotive air horns

Collecting
Encodings
Locomotive parts
Railway safety
Sound production